On the Fringe 2011 (simplified Chinese: 边缘父子) is a Singaporean Chinese drama which was telecasted on Singapore's free-to-air channel, MediaCorp Channel 8. The show's main cast were Li Nanxing, Fann Wong, Rui En and Zhang Yaodong, with Li returning to the drama career after a two-year hiatus. The show which lasted 20 episodes premiered on 2 August 2011 and ended on 29 August 2011. This drama is a remake from the 1987 series of the same name, which also stars Li and features ex-prisoners and similar antiheroes.

Synopsis
Yao Zhiyong and his group of friends are a gang of rebellious teenagers who call themselves the WCS. They regularly get into fights with rival gangs. On one such occasion, Zhiyong and his friends had a close brush with the law when the police were called in. At home, he has been walking the thin line by trying to keep his "extracurricular activities" away from his mother.

Meanwhile, Tian Yibang is nearing the end of his jail sentence and reminisces about his old life. Before going to jail, he had been happily married and had a baby son. He refused to change to his old ways and the police soon caught up with him. His wife later came to prison and told him that she was taking away their son and raise him herself without acknowledging him as the birth father. Heartbroken, Yibang resolves to change his life around.

Yibang is released from prison and tries to find some work. At the same time, Zhiyong has been getting into trouble and by chance, their paths cross. Yibang sees his old self in Zhiyong and attempts to help Zhiyong before he goes on the road of no return. To his shock, he later discovers that Zhiyong is his long-lost biological son. Can Yibang help Zhiyong before it is too late?

Cast

Members of Gang

Yao Zhiyong's parents

Ah Ya's parents

Other Adults

Teen Delinquents

Awards & Nominations

Star Awards 2012
The show received 12 nominations in the 2012 Star Awards ceremony, which tied another drama (Devotion) for its most nominations for a ceremony. The series won three awards (which also tied with two other dramas, A Tale of 2 Cities and Love Thy Neighbour) as the largest count of awards for a ceremony; with the show winning the year's Best Drama Serial, this show became the first television remake to win the Drama Serial award.

External links

Singapore Chinese dramas
Chinese-language television shows
2011 Singaporean television series debuts
2011 Singaporean television series endings
Channel 8 (Singapore) original programming
Television remakes
Triad (organized crime)